Gwadar Fish Harbour is located in the city of Gwadar, in the Gwadar District of southwestern Balochistan Province, southwest Pakistan.

It is operated by the Federal Ministry of Communication.

See also 
 List of fish harbours of Pakistan
 Karachi Fisheries Harbour Authority
 Fisheries Research and Training Institute, Lahore
 Pishukan

External link 
 A brief on Fisheries in Pakistan

Gwadar District
Economy of Balochistan, Pakistan
Fish harbours of Pakistan